Cameraria hexalobina is a moth of the family Gracillariidae. It is known from South Africa and the Democratic Republic of the Congo. The habitat consists of savannah vegetation with high standing dry grass.

The length of the forewings is 2.9–3.1 mm. The forewing ground colour is reddish ochreous with blackish fuscous markings, consisting of two transverse fasciae, one costal strigula and a marked blackish-fuscous area along the termen. The hindwings are pale ochreous greyish with long pale fringe slightly darker shaded than the hindwing. Adults are on wing from late March to late April.

The larvae feed on Hexalobus glabrescens and Hexalobus monopetalus. They mine the leaves of their host plant. The mine has the form of a large, oval or oblong, opaque, tentiform mine on the upperside of the leaf.

References

Moths described in 1961
Cameraria (moth)
Moths of Sub-Saharan Africa

Leaf miners
Lepidoptera of South Africa
Lepidoptera of the Democratic Republic of the Congo
Taxa named by Lajos Vári